King Size Terror is a German hip hop group of Turkish, Peruvian, and Afro-American origin.

Based out of Nuremberg, the group produced the first Turkish language rap in the budding German hip hop scene. Their song, "Bir Yabancinin Hayati" ("The Life of the Stranger"), marked the beginning of a new genre in German music. Turkish German rap has grown as an offshoot from its African-American counterpart. AK (later Alper Aga), rapper of King Size Terror, founded Karakan, which was one of the first Turkish Hip Hop crews. they released the single "Defol Dazlak" (Piss Off, Skin), which became something like a hymn for Turkish kids in Germany. Later Karakan became part of the first successful project of Turkish Hip Hop: Cartel. 
Many Turkish German hip hop artists claim that the lyrically based art form is a means of highlighting their situation, and releasing the anger and frustration associated with poverty and social marginalization. The most famous and successful member of the group is the Peruvian German rapper, producer, DJ, and MC, Chill Fresh. King Size Terror has released two official albums. Their first, which was independently produced in 1991, is titled The Word Is Subversion. Three years later, Blunt Records produced the popular full-length album Ultimatum. In 1997 Karakan released their first and only album "Al Sana Karakan", which was completely produced by Chill Fresh (except "Hepsi Benim" which was produced by AK's younger brother, Suikast, who was also a feature MC on "Ultimatum").

References 

German hip hop groups